Stanislas Wawrinka was the defending champion, but hasn't entered this year.
Pablo Andújar defeated Potito Starace 6–1, 6–2 in the final match.

Seeds
The top four seeds receive a bye into the second round.

Qualifying

Draw

Finals

Top half

Bottom half

External links
 Main Draw
 Qualifying Draw

Grand Prix Hassan II - Singles
2011 Grand Prix Hassan II